Dogolion is a genus of moths belonging to the family Tortricidae.

Species
Dogolion oligodon Razowski & Pelz, 2003
Dogolion textrix Razowski & Wojtusiak, 2006

See also
List of Tortricidae genera

References

 , 2005: World catalogue of insects volume 5 Tortricidae
 , 2003: Tortricidae collected in Ecuador in the years 1996–1999: Euliini (Lepidoptera). Nachrichten des Entomologischen Vereins Apollo NF 24(4): 189–207.

External links
tortricidae.com

Euliini
Tortricidae genera